The 1999–2000 Greek Basket League season was the 60th season of the Greek Basket League, the highest tier professional basketball league in Greece. It was also the 8th season of Greek Basket League championship that was regulated by HEBA (ESAKE). The winner of the league was Panathinaikos, which beat PAOK in the league's playoff's finals, although the regular season winner was Olympiacos. The clubs Sporting and Esperos were relegated to the Greek A2 League. The top scorer of the league was Alphonso Ford, a player of Peristeri. Željko Rebrača was voted the MVP of the league.

Teams

Regular season

Source: esake.gr, galanissportsdata.com

Playoffs

The finals

Final standings

Top Players

References

External links
 Official HEBA Site
 Official Hellenic Basketball Federation Site
   HEBA Site, season 1999/00
  Galanis Sports Data 

Greek Basket League seasons
 
Greek